Mount Carmel forest fire may refer to:
 1989 Mount Carmel forest fire
 2010 Mount Carmel forest fire